Sceloporus taeniocnemis, the Guatemalan emerald spiny lizard, is a species of lizard in the family Phrynosomatidae. It is endemic to Mexico and Guatemala.

References

Sceloporus
Reptiles of Mexico
Reptiles of Guatemala
Reptiles described in 1885
Taxa named by Edward Drinker Cope